The Ferrets were an Australian pop band. They are best known for their song "Don't Fall in Love" and album, Dreams of a Love which were both released in 1977.

History

1975: Formation
Ken Firth, Phil Eizenberg and William "Billy" Miller had been involved with the Australian stage production of Jesus Christ Superstar (1972–1974) which also included singer-actors Jon English, John Paul Young and Rory O'Donoghue.

Firth (bass guitar, backing vocals), Miller (vocals, guitar) and Dave Springfield (guitar, backing vocals) were all members of hard rockers Buster Brown (which also featured vocalist Angry Anderson later of Rose Tattoo). In November 1975 the trio left Buster Brown to join guitarist Eizenberg and formed The Ferrets. Drummer Rick Brewer (ex-Zoot) joined in April 1976 followed by Miller's sisters Jane Miller (backing vocals, keyboard) and Pam Miller (backing vocals) in July—they were now a seven-piece band.

1976-1977: "Don't Fall in Love" and Dreams of a Love
After favourable reactions from audiences in Melbourne and Sydney, The Ferrets produced a demo tape that caught the attention of Ian "Molly" Meldrum talent coordinator for Australian Broadcasting Corporation (ABC) TV series Countdown. Meldrum got them signed to Mushroom Records and started producing their debut album, Dreams of a Love, in July 1976.

In April 1977 they released their debut single, "Robin Hood", which did not chart. After nearly a year, production of the album was still incomplete, so The Ferrets took over—assisted by recording engineers Tony Cohen and Ian MacKenzie—Meldrum was attributed as "Willie Everfinish".

In June 1977, The Ferrets released the double A-side single "Don't Fall in Love"/"Lies". Meldrum had carefully crafted "Lies" taking weeks whilst "Don't Fall in Love"  was recorded in three hours. The Ferrets premiered on Countdown in an episode compered by Jon English performing "Don't Fall in Love", which peaked at No. 2 Nationally. They were awarded with 'Best Australian TV Performer' at the 1977 King of Pop Awards for their Countdown appearances.

In October 1977, The Ferret's released "Janie May" which reached No. 25 nationally and was televised on Countdown on 13 November 1977, which also featured the infamous Prince Charles interview. Their debut album Dreams of a Love was released in October 1977 and achieved Gold record status. The album cover depicted a model (Wendy Bannister) holding a snarling ferret on her shoulder.

1978-1979: Fame at Any Price and disbandment
By the end of 1977, guitarist Eizenberg and backing vocalist Pam Miller had left. After another single, "Are You Looking at Me?" was released in April 1978. Jane Miller also left. The Ferrets continued to tour and recorded their second studio album Fame at Any Price which was produced by Cohen and released in October 1978. There were disappointing sales for the related singles "This Night" (written by Frank Howson, Firth, Miller) and "Tripsville" and for the album itself. Firth also left to be replaced successively by George Cross (previously in Jim Keays Southern Cross with Brewer) and Ric Petropolis. The Ferrets had no further chart success and disbanded in March 1979.

Subsequent careers
 Philip Eizenberg: Played bass guitar in Mighty Guys (1980s) with Mick Hamilton and Leon Isackson. He studied martial arts from 1984 (at age 34) and was registered with the Australian Hapkido Association as a 4th Degree instructor. He played bass on Night of the Gale with Phill Raymond in 2006.

Kenneth "Ken" David Firth: Rejoined Miller in Billy Miller and the Great Blokes (1979–1982), then temporarily with Divinyls (1982) while they replaced out-going bassist Jeremy Paul with Rick Grossman. Firth was in Interchange Bench (1993–1998) with Miller again. He was a session musician on Miller's CDs Victoria (1998) and Elsternwick '69 (2000).

William "Billy/Bill" Harris Miller: Produced Frank Howson's cover version of The Ferrets' song "Killing Ourselves" (co-written by Howson and Springfield). Wrote the song "Moon and Stars" for the ABC TV series Sweet and Sour in 1984. Session musician on Howson's The Boy Who Dared To Dream LP, member of various bands including: Billy Miller and The Great Blokes (1979–1982), The Spaniards (1983–1986), Interchange Bench (1993–1998), The Dave Graney Show (1998–2004) and Dave Graney ‘n’ The Lurid Yellow Mist (2004–?). Some of these have included Firth or Springfield.
In 2018 Miller started working on a project with former Sports vocalist, Stephen Cummings

Dave Springfield (aka David John Schofield): Rejoined Miller, briefly, in The Spaniards. Released a country music CD Rev J D Love as Rev J D Love aka David J Schofield.

Rick Brewer: Later joined The Motivators (1980–1982) and Greg Baker's Blues Party.

George Cross: Performed in Jim Keays Band during 1999.

Rick Petropolis: Also in the Motivators (with Brewer) and later in Rattlesnake (1991).

2006: Countdown Spectacular
Billy Miller performed "Don't Fall in Love" for the first Countdown Spectacular Tour of Australia from June to August 2006 and can be seen on the associated DVD (disc 1 track 16). Also on this tour were Jon English and John Paul Young from his Jesus Christ Superstar days.

Members
Philip Eizenberg – guitar (1975–1977)
Kenneth Firth – bass guitar (1975–1978)
William Miller – vocals, guitar (1975–1979)
David Springfield – guitar (1975–1979)
Rick Brewer – drums (1976–1979)
Jane Miller – backing vocals, keyboards (1976–1978)
Pam Miller – backing vocals (1976–1977)
George Cross – bass guitar (1978)
Ric Petropolis – bass guitar (1978–1979)

Discography

Studio albums

Singles

Awards and nominations

King of Pop Awards
The King of Pop Awards were voted by the readers of TV Week. The King of Pop award started in 1967 and ran through to 1978.

|-
| 1977
| themselves (on Countdown)
| Best Australian TV Performer
| 
|-

References

General
  Note: Archived [on-line] copy has limited functionality.
 
Specific

External links
 Billy Miller official website

Australian rock music groups
Musical groups disestablished in 1979
Musical groups established in 1975
New South Wales musical groups
Victoria (Australia) musical groups